Vita Buivid (born Victoria Buivid; born 1962) is a Ukrainian-born  research-based contemporary artist and photographer living in Amsterdam.

Buivid, started working with animation and painting, after graduation from the Dnepropetrovsk State University in 1988. She moved to Leningrad (now St. Petersburg, Russia), and later to Moscow, and to the Netherlands...

Life
Vita was born in Dnepropetrovsk, USSR, now Ukraine. Buivid has been engaged in contemporary art since the late 1980s, initially photography and photo-based art. In the early 1990s, she began to add to her work watercolour, oil, textiles and collage, not limited by pure print.

Since 1990 she has taken part in numerous exhibitions in Russia and worldwide. In 1994, Vita received a grant from the CIRC Foundation promoting cultural exchange between Russia and the Netherlands and worked on a project regarding the influence of Dutch art on Russian culture. With support from Rutgers University, she travelled to New York to work on a photo project, and also was influenced by fashion photography and started to work with local fashion magazines on her return to Russia. In 2000 Vita received a grant from la Mairie de Paris and spent two months at the Cité internationale des arts residence working on project «Paris. Red» and produced a limited edition artist book.

Vita Buivid is considered to be one of the forward-thinking feminists in Russian art. The most remarkable projects in recent years have been a series of «How I Spent My Summer», nominated for a Kandinsky Prize in 2009, colliding the collage images of peaceful relaxation with a military invasion, and «Peonymania», 2013. Both projects are based on carefully guarded family history, discovered and interpreted by the artist.

Exhibitions

Selected solo shows 

 2022 – TEXT/TEXTILE; not (too) old/ not (too) you young, Hotel Maria Kapel, Hoorn
 2017 – Fragments, RuArts gallery, Moscow
 2017 – Family portrait in an Interior, We-Fest, Urban culture centrum, Perm, Russia
 2016 – My Love Is Not a Wisp of Smoke, Moscow Museum of Modern Art
 2013 – Peonymania, RuArts gallery, Moscow
 2013 – Reservoir Dogs, AL gallery, St. Petersburg
 2013 – Act of civil status, Karas gallery, Kiev 
 2011 – Workdays, Museum of the History of Photography, St. Petersburg 
 2010 – Love me as I love you, Karas gallery, Kiev
 2008 – How I Spent My Summer, ARTStrelka projects gallery, Moscow
 2007 – Photo-knitwear, “Fashion and Style in Photography" Biennale, Moscow Museum of Modern Art
 2006 – Familia, Freud Dream Museum, St. Petersburg

My love is not a wisp of smoke, 2016 – retrospective 

In 2016 Moscow Museum of Modern Art and RuArts Foundation of Contemporary Art presented the first Vita Buivid's retrospective show. The project occupied five floors of the museum venue on Ermolaevsky, 17 and contained projects, created by the author from the early 1990s till the present time. It is the first time when the oeuvre of the artist is presented in such a full. The works by the artist can be attributed to the photo-based art. However, every time the artist manages to expand the borders of the genre. In her artworks, the aesthetics are united with the expressive and unfinished «democratic» photography. However, this form is filled with the in-depth content of different levels of perception. Each series by the artist is a social and cultural narrative, revealing details of the bohemian lifestyle, family conflicts, personal experiences, which turns into large-scale research, able to move the audience from the emotional maturity to existential.

Selected group shows 

 2018 – Women at Work: Subverting the Feminine in Post-Soviet Russia, White Space Gallery, London
 2017 – Personal Structures, European Cultural center, Palazzo Bembo, Venice
 2017 – Too Much as Not Enough, Shtager gallery, London
 2016 – Sfumato, Arkaniya Gallery, Tbilisi, Georgia
 2015 – WAR/SHE, Kharkov, Ukraine
 2014 – Ukrainian Landscape, Mystetskyi Arsenal, Kiev
 2013 – Dinner is Served, The State Russian Museum, St. Petersburg
 2013 – ARCHSTOYANIE, Land art festival, Kaluzhskaya Oblast, Russia
 2012 – Anonymous, Perm Museum of Contemporary Art (PERMM), Russia
 2012 – FotoFest 2012 Biennial: Contemporary Russian Photography, Houston, TX, USA
 2012 – Straight Look – Contemporary photography from Eastern Europe, pop/off/art gallery, Berlin
 2011 – INDEPENDENT: new art of the new country 1991–2011, Mystetskyi Arsenal, Kiev
 2010 – ŽEN d’АRТ. The Gender History of Art in the Post-Soviet Space: 1989–2009, Moscow Museum of Modern Art

Awards and collections 
Buivid was shortlisted for Kandinsky Prize in 2009 and 2017 and Sergey Kuryokhin Modern Art Award in 2012 and 2013.

Artists' works are in private and museum collections, such as: Moscow House of Photography; The State Russian Museum, St. Petersburg; RuArts Foundation, Moscow; Museum of Contemporary Art Kiasma, Helsinki; The Forbes Collection, Navigator foundation, Boston; Mőlndal commun collection, Sweden; Harry Ransom Center at the University of Texas, Austin and others.

Some of Buivid's artworks already on a secondary art market and presented by leading auction houses, including Sotheby's, Bonhams and Vladey

Name transcriptions 
Artists' name Vita Buivid has been variously transcript from Cyrillic (Вита Буйвид), and the last name can also be spelt as Buyvid, Bujvid or Bouivid; while first name variations include Victoria or Viktoria; and possible combinations of above

References

External links 

 Vita Buivid – artist's website
 Vita Buivid – UPHA — Ukrainian Photographic Alternative
 RusArtNet.com – Biographies – Victoria (Vita) Buivid

1962 births
Living people
Russian contemporary artists
Russian women photographers
Oles Honchar Dnipro National University alumni
Artists from Dnipro
Artists from Saint Petersburg
20th-century Russian women
21st-century Russian women
20th-century Russian women artists
21st-century Russian women artists
20th-century photographers
21st-century photographers
Ukrainian expatriates in Russia
Kandinsky Prize
20th-century women photographers
21st-century women photographers